École secondaire Antoine-de-Saint-Exupéry is a Francophone public and co-educational secondary school in St. Leonard, Quebec. A part of the Commission scolaire de la Pointe-de-l'Île, it was originally in the Roman Catholic Commission scolaire Jérôme-Le Royer before the 1998 reorganization of school districts.

References

External links
 École secondaire Antoine-de-Saint-Exupéry 
  

High schools in Quebec